The Hellenic Triathlon Federation was founded in 1996 and is the official governing body for the multi-sport disciplines of triathlon, duathlon and aquathlon in Greece.

References

External links
 Official Site

Greece
Triathlon